Gyeongsan is a city in North Gyeongsang Province, South Korea.  Its western border abuts the metropolitan city of Daegu, and much of Gyeongsan lies within the Daegu metropolitan area.

Numerous universities are located in Gyeongsan, such as Yeungnam University, Daegu University, Daekyeung University, Catholic University of Daegu, Daegu Haany University and Gyeongil University.

Symbols of City
The city flower is the magnolia which grows well even in poor soil conditions. The city bird is the magpie. Its clear song reflects the bright and hopeful spirits of citizens. The city tree is the ginkgo. It symbolizes the constant prosperity, perseverance and elegant traits of Gyeongsan citizens.

International Chemistry Olympiad
Gyeongsan was the host for the 38th International Chemistry Olympiad (2 July 2006 - 11 July 2006).

Twin towns – sister cities

Gyeongsan is twinned with:

 Gangdong (Seoul), South Korea
 Jōyō, Japan
 Sinan, South Korea
 Xihai'an, China

Administrative districts

Gyeongsan is divided into 3 eup, 5 myeon and 7 dong. Amnyang was promoted to eup status on 1 January 2020.

Location
Gyeongsan city lies mid-western part of Gyeongsangbuk-do. It is close to several big cities such as Daegu, Ulsan, Busan and many other places.

Climate
The climate is mild because of its southern location. However, being landlocked makes its climate continental.

The amount of rainfall is less than the average yearly rainfall of Korea, due to its geographical characteristics.

Religion
Hwanseongsa, temple

See also
 List of cities in South Korea

References

External links

City government web site

 

 
Cities in North Gyeongsang Province